Peter Pan Syndrome is a studio album by American hip hop artist J-Zone. It was released on Old Maid Entertainment on September 3, 2013.

Critical reception
Nate Patrin of Pitchfork gave the album a 7.5 out of 10, saying, "J-Zone's aggravated flow and stand-up-ready delivery lends itself to some sharp observations on class struggle, gentrification, and the travails of thwarted upward mobility." He added, "Peter Pan Syndrome is such a focused and niche-satisfying record that it likely wouldn't work worth a damn if J-Zone didn't have his heart in it, but in what appears to be a welcome 180, he goes off and performs like somebody who's never been burned by the business." Aaron Matthews of Exclaim! gave the album an 8 out of 10, saying, "it's his honest, sharp and funny writing that makes Peter Pan Syndrome one of the first rap records to capture life in this decade."

Spin listed it as the 17th best hip-hop album of 2013. Impose included it on the "Best Albums of 2013" list.

Track listing

References

Further reading

External links
 
 

2013 albums
J-Zone albums